A by-election for the seat of Canterbury in the New South Wales Legislative Assembly was held on 1 February 1986. The by-election was triggered by the resignation of  MP Kevin Stewart to accept the post of Agent-General for NSW in London.

By-elections for the seats of Cabramatta and Kiama were held on the same day.

Dates

Results

 MP Kevin Stewart resigned to accept the post of Agent-General for NSW in London.

See also
Electoral results for the district of Canterbury
List of New South Wales state by-elections

References

1986 elections in Australia
New South Wales state by-elections
1980s in New South Wales